The Edmonton Corn Maze is a popular attraction west of Edmonton, Alberta.

It is open from August to October annually and is themed around a local event or attraction. The Edmonton Corn Maze is part of "The MAiZE". The MAiZE is the largest corn maze company in the world and helps with the design and operation of corn mazes.

History
The maze has been created every year since 2001. Every year a different maze design is cut into the field.
2001: Edmonton 2001 World Championships
2002: an oil derrick
2003: Edmonton Eskimos (quarterback Ricky Ray)
2004: Edmonton's Centennial 
2005: a bull rider
2006: Edmonton Oilers (Left Wing Ryan Smyth)
2007: Edmonton Oil Kings (Goaltender Cam Lanigan)
2008: Edmonton Indy
2009: Tim Hortons Roar of the Rings (Curler Kevin Martin)
2010: Edmonton's Food Bank's mascot - "Fill – Up"
2011: 2012 World Junior Ice Hockey Championships logo
2012: CISN-FM's 30th anniversary
2013: ATB Financial's 75th anniversary and a bucket of popcorn
2014: 630 CHED Santas Anonymous and Santa
2015: Martin Deerline's 50th anniversary and a John Deere tractor
2016: EPCOR's 125th anniversary
2017: an exosuit from BioWare's Anthem
2018: Edmonton Oilers (Captain Connor McDavid)
2019: The Stollery Children's Hospital bear mascot and the hashtag #StolleryBackyard

External links
Edmonton Corn Maze
The MAiZE

Mazes
Buildings and structures in Edmonton
Maize